Winchester Center station is a temporarily closed MBTA Commuter Rail station in Winchester, Massachusetts. The station, located on a viaduct in downtown Winchester, was closed effective January 8, 2021 due to structural deterioration. Prior to closure, it served all Lowell Line trains as well as a limited number of Haverhill Line trains which run via the Wildcat Branch. Winchester Center station was not accessible prior to the closure, but accessible high-level platforms are being added during renovations taking place from December 2021 to April 2024.

History

Early history

The Boston and Lowell Railroad opened between its namesake cities in 1835; local stops were added soon after. Woburn Gates station – later Winchester – was open by 1838. By the 1840s, service on the line was suitable for commuting to Boston. Elimination of the grade crossing at Winchester was considered in 1903 and 1906, and again in 1915. The B&M installed bike racks at the station in 1942 in an effort to reduce parking needs.

In the early 1950s, the B&M began planning a project to raise the tracks of the New Hampshire Main Line and the southern end of the Woburn Branch for a mile through Winchester, eliminating troublesome grade crossings downtown.

Until 1981, the Woburn Branch diverged from the main line just north of the Winchester Center platforms. A short stub is still in place.

Repair work

Winchester Center station has not been substantially renovated since the viaduct was completed in 1957. In September 2008, the MBTA approved $1.4 million in platform and ramps repairs, as well as electrical and lighting work, at the station. The work was completed in 2010; the MBTA intended to renovate the station before the 5-year life of the platform patches was reached.

On July 7, 2015, the Winchester Department of Public Works discovered a hole in the inbound platform, which prompted the closure of the northern  of the platform and one ramp due to concrete deterioration. One ramp and the remaining section of the platform remained open for service. The MBTA planned to make temporary repairs before the end of the year. Further repairs were made in 2017 to support the platforms and ramps.

Reconstruction
The MBTA is making renovations to the station which will repair water damage and make it fully accessible. The station design was advanced to 15% in December 2011; Jacobs Engineering was then chosen as the contractor for final design in June 2012. Funding issues prevented this design work from beginning until 2013. It was later determined that the mini-high platforms of the 15% design were not sufficient for state accessibility requirements, and that full-length high-level platforms would be required. The town objected to simply changing the design to accommodate these platforms.

After several iterations, a new 15% design was reached in December 2015. The rebuilt station will have -long high-level platforms; although shorter than the  MBTA standard, they will still be able to platform 9 cars. A gauntlet track may be installed to allow Pan Am Railways freight trains to pass. A new interlocking may be built south of the station, which will allow greater flexibility during construction and allow the retirement of the former Woburn Branch interlocking north of the station after completion. Although early designs called for replacement of existing ramps, the new 15% design added two redundant elevators at the southern end of each platform. The 1957-built station was originally to be demolished to make room for the elevators and staircases. The northern ramp to the outbound platform will be moved north of the adjacent rotary; the northern inbound ramp will be rebuilt at its present location south of the rotary, with the possibility of an additional ramp north of the rotary in the future.

Design of the station was then expected to be completed by the end of 2016, with the $25.8 million construction beginning in 2017. By October 2016, bidding was expected to begin that December. The MBTA designated $34 million in funding in 2016, but the projected cost rose to $54 million by 2018. By late 2019, the total project budget was $49.9 million: $7.3 million for design and $42.5 million for construction. By May 2020, the MBTA expected to begin construction in fall 2020, with completion in spring 2023. However, the project was put on hold in 2020 due to budgetary issues caused by the COVID-19 pandemic. 

The station was closed effective January 8, 2021 due to deterioration. On January 11, the MBTA reinstated funding for the project due to the closure. The MBTA received a demolition permit on January 25. Demolition of the ramps was completed in June 2021. A $47.6 million construction contract was approved on October 27, 2021. The 28-month construction phase began in December 2021. Site preparation began in March 2022. Demolition of the remaining platforms and ramps took place in May and June 2022. , some demolition and utility work lasted through the remainder of 2022, with construction of the new station beginning in July 2022. A formal groundbreaking ceremony was held on June 30, 2022. Construction was 25% complete by December 2022, with completion expected in April 2024.

References

External links

 MBTA – Winchester Center
 MBTA – Winchester Center Station Accessibility Improvements
 Church Street entrance from Google Maps Street View

MBTA Commuter Rail stations in Middlesex County, Massachusetts
Buildings and structures in Winchester, Massachusetts